Gader Mousa  is a Qatari football midfielder who played for Qatar in the 2004 Asian Cup. He also played for Al Shamal Amil.

External links

Qatari footballers
1982 births
Living people
Umm Salal SC players
Al-Sailiya SC players
Al Kharaitiyat SC players
Al-Shamal SC players
Al-Rayyan SC players
Al-Markhiya SC players
Mesaimeer SC players
Qatar Stars League players
Qatari Second Division players
Association football midfielders